The Sheats Apartments, also known as L'Horizon and sometimes mistakenly as the Sheets Apartments, is a historic eight-unit, multi-family building located at 10919 Strathmore Drive, in the Westwood neighborhood of Los Angeles, California. It is colloquially referred to as The Treehouse by UCLA students.

History 
Designed in 1948 in the futuristic style by Los Angeles architect John Lautner, it was completed in 1949 for Neo-Fauvist artist Helen Taylor Sheats, who assisted in the design, and her second husband, dean of University of California Extension Paul Henry Sheats, who was also a professor at UCLA.

Because of its proximity to University of California, Los Angeles (UCLA), it was intended for and has been used primarily for student occupancy. In their book An Architectural Guidebook to Los Angeles, David Gebhard and Robert Winter praised its functionality by noting, "each apartment [is] completely separated from the others . . . with its own terraces, decks, and outdoor garden space." However, its condition in recent years has deteriorated, with visiting professor and former presidential candidate Michael Dukakis calling it "a dump" in 2004.

On June 21, 1988, the City of Los Angeles designated the building as a Los Angeles Historic-Cultural Monument.

See also 

 Sheats-Goldstein House

References

External links
 Photos atPanoramio 
 Photos at Modern Architecture and Historic Buildings

Los Angeles Historic-Cultural Monuments
Modernist architecture in California
Apartment buildings in Los Angeles
Westwood, Los Angeles
Residential buildings completed in 1949